Gérard Bouchard  (born 1943) is a Canadian historian and sociologist affiliated with the Université du Québec à Chicoutimi. Born on 26 December 1943 in Jonquière, Quebec, he obtained his master's degree in sociology from Université Laval in 1968 and later obtained his PhD in history from the University of Paris in 1971. Bouchard had authored, co-authored, edited, or co-edited 26 books, and published 230 papers in scientific journals as of 2005.

Bouchard is the younger brother of Lucien Bouchard, Premier of Quebec from 1996 to 2001. Like his brother, he is a supporter of the Quebec sovereignty movement. In 2007, he was appointed along with Charles Taylor to chair a provincial government inquiry into "reasonable accommodation".

Timeline 

 1971 – He begins teaching at the Université du Québec à Chicoutimi.
 1972 – He founds the BALSAC database
 1976 – He founds the Société de recherches sur les populations (SOREP), which became the Institut interuniversitaire de recherche sur les populations (IREP) in 1994.
 1985 – He receives the Jacques Rousseau Award of the Association canadienne-française pour l'avancement des sciences.
 1993 – he receives the Prix du Québec (Prix Léon-Gérin for Science) for his contribution to social studies.
 1999 – His work La Nation québécoise au futur et au passé is published.
 2000 – He receives the Governor General Literary Award for his work Genèse des nations et cultures du Nouveau Monde.
 2001 – He receives an honorary doctorate from McGill University.
 2002 – His first fictional work, is published. A second novel entitled Pikauba followed in 2005.
 2002 – Was made a Knight of the Legion of Honour by the French government.
 2003 – His work Les Deux Chanoines – Contradiction et ambivalence dans la pensée de Lionel Groulx is published.
 2004 – His work , 1850–1960 is published.
 2006 – He receives an honorary doctorate from the Université de Moncton.
 February 2007 – He is named co-chair, along with the philosopher Charles Taylor, of the Bouchard–Taylor Commission, a one-year Quebec commission to examine the issue of "reasonable accommodation" for minorities in the province.

See also 
 Imaginary (sociology)

References

External links 
 Homepage of Gérard Bouchard at the UQAC
 Various newspaper articles on Gérard Bouchard
 Profile on the Website of the Canadian Institute for Advanced Research
 Article de Gérard Bouchard, présentant son ouvrage L'interculturalisme : Un point de vue québécois, 2012.

1943 births
20th-century Canadian historians
20th-century Canadian male writers
21st-century Canadian historians
21st-century Canadian male writers
21st-century Canadian novelists
Academics in Quebec
Canadian male non-fiction writers
Canadian male novelists
Canadian novelists in French
Canadian sociologists
French Quebecers
Governor General's Award-winning non-fiction writers
Historians of Quebec
Quebec sovereigntists
Critics of multiculturalism
Living people
Writers from Saguenay, Quebec
Historians from Quebec
Université Laval alumni
University of Paris alumni
Academic staff of Université Laval
Canadian expatriates in France